Louis-Charles Gaston de Nogaret de la Valette de Foix, duke de La Vallette and Candale (14 April 1627 - 28 January 1658) was a French peer and Colonel General of the Infantry.

Biography
He was born in Metz, the son of Bernard de Nogaret de La Valette de Foix (1592-1661), duke of Épernon, and Gabrielle Angélique de Bourbon (1603-1627).

See also
 Duke of Kendal

1627 births
1658 deaths
Military personnel from Metz